Binsfeld is a village in the commune of Weiswampach, in northern Luxembourg.  , the village had a population of 220.

History
The discovery of an extended field of Roman tombs in the early 1970s has confirmed the existence of Roman colonies in the neighbourhood of Binsfeld. Artifacts from the tombs can be seen at the History Museum in the City of Luxembourg.

Church
By the 15th century, a chapel existed in Binsfeld. However, by the late 19th century, the population was outgrowing the chapel, and in 1892 planning began for a church. The church was built in the Gothic style, and consecrated to the Holy Trinity on 20 May 1894. The patron saints are St. Anthony and St. Hubertus.

Attractions
“A Schiewesch” is 300-year-old farmhouse which, along with its neighbouring buildings, has been renovated in the traditional rural manner, and now houses more than 1100 exhibits. The museum seeks to reveal the past 300 years of rural living through its displays of household pieces, shoemaker's and weaver's workshops, stables, agricultural equipment, and more.

A Maulusmühle is a monument to aircraft of World War II, near Binsfeld and partially owned by the municipality of Weiswampach. It includes the wreckage of a downed airplane.

See also
 List of villages in Luxembourg

Footnotes

Weiswampach
Villages in Luxembourg